In molecular biology, the GRIP domain is a conserved protein domain. The GRIP (golgin-97, RanBP2alpha, Imh1p and p230/golgin-245) domain is found in many large coiled-coil proteins. It has been shown to be sufficient for targeting to the Golgi. It contains a completely conserved tyrosine residue.

References

Protein families